Aurelio Tolentino y Valenzuela (October 15, 1869 – July 5, 1915) was a Filipino playwright, poet, journalist, and revolutionary. His works at the turn of the 20th century depicted his desire to see Philippine independence from its colonizers. He was arrested twice, first by the Spaniards and later by American forces. He wrote and directed the anti-imperialist play Kahapon, Ngayon at Bukas (Yesterday, Today and Tomorrow), which led to his arrest in 1903.

Early life and career
Tolentino was born in Santo Cristo, Guagua, Pampanga, he was the third and youngest child of Leonardo Tolentino and Patrona Valenzuela. Tolentino received his Bachelor of Arts degree from Colegio de San Juan de Letran, and read law at the University of Santo Tomas.

Later in his life, Aurelio Tolentino moved to Tondo, Manila, where he became a court desk official.

Later career
In Tondo he met Andres Bonifacio, one of the founders of Katipunan and eventual leader of the Philippine revolution against Spain. Tolentino would eventually become an early member of the Katipunan. He accompanied Bonifacio in their search for a secret headquarters in the mountains of Morong province (now Rizal) in preparation for the start of the Philippine Revolution.

Tolentino was arrested shortly after the start of the war and was detained for nine months. He took part in the revolutionary campaigns of Gen. Vicente Lukban after his release. He continued to support the cause for Philippine sovereignty and became one of the signatories of the Declaration of Independence in Kawit, Cavite, in 1898.

When Spain ceded the Philippines to the United States, Tolentino formed Junta de Amigos, a secret organization composed of former Katipuneros to fight for independence from the Americans. Later, he attempted to reorganize the Revolutionary Army but was unsuccessful, in part due to the surrender of Emilio Aguinaldo. This led Tolentino to shift his focus from warfare to propaganda. He edited several anti-US newspapers in Tagalog and Kapampangan, some of which were closed down by the American authorities.

On May 14, 1903, his now famous verse drama, Kahapon, Ngayon at Bukas, premiered at Manila's Teatro Libertad. The script called for tearing of the American flag, which was seen by some Americans in the audience. After the show, he was promptly arrested for sedition and rebellion. He was pardoned in 1912 by Governor General W. Cameron Forbes partly due to pressure from Washington.

After his release, he continued to write for the theater. Among his later works is Ang Bagong Cristo, a proletarian interpretation of the story of Christ.

Tolentino also founded the first worker's cooperative in the Philippines, Samahang Hanapbuhay ng Mahihirap, as well as El Parnaso Filipino, a school for the promotion of Tagalog literature.

Death
Tolentino died on July 5, 1915, in Manila. He was buried in the Manila North Cemetery. His remains were transferred to his hometown in Guagua in 1921, where it is interred under a commemorative monument.

In popular culture
 The Little Theater of the Cultural Center of the Philippines is named after Aurelio Tolentino.
Tolentino was portrayed by Francis Magalona in the 1997 TV series, of ABS-CBN's Bayani
Tolentino was portrayed by VJ Mendoza in the 2013 TV series, Katipunan.
Tolentino's life was the subject of the 2017 rock opera Aurelio Sedisyoso, staged by Tanghalang Pilipino at the Cultural Center of the Philippines.

References

External links
 
 
 

1869 births
1915 deaths
Writers from Pampanga
People from Tondo, Manila
People from Guagua
Kapampangan people
Filipino dramatists and playwrights
Colegio de San Juan de Letran alumni
University of Santo Tomas alumni
People of the Philippine Revolution
People of the Philippine–American War
Members of the Philippine Independent Church
Burials at the Manila North Cemetery